Chowder is an American animated television series created by C. H. Greenblatt that premiered on Cartoon Network on November 2, 2007. The series follows an aspiring young boy named Chowder and his day-to-day adventures as an apprentice in Chef Mung Daal's catering company. Although he means well, Chowder often finds himself in predicaments due to his perpetual appetite and his nature as a scatterbrain. Chowder's guidance in his goal to become a master chef is influenced by Mung's wife, Truffles; Mung's assistant, Shnitzel; Mung's rival, Endive; Endive's apprentice, who has a perpetual crush on Chowder, Panini; as well as other side characters.

Chowder ran for three seasons with a total of 49 episodes. It received mostly positive reviews, as well as one Primetime Emmy Award win, six Annie Award nominations, and two additional Emmy Award nominations during its run. The series finale, "Chowder Grows Up", aired on August 7, 2010.

Plot
The series revolves around the title character, an aspiring young cook in Chef Mung Daal's catering company. Though he is lighthearted and carefree, Chowder's actions habitually land him in circumstances that are out of his control, partly due to his hunger and absent-mindedness. His caregivers, Mung and Truffles Daal, as well as Shnitzel, a rock monster who works for Mung, and Kimchi, Chowder's gaseous pet, try to aid Chowder in his ambitions to become a great chef, but they frequently find themselves undermined by the calamitous antics that ensue. Chowder is also undermined by Panini, a girl who has an unrequited love for Chowder, going so far as to say that he is her boyfriend despite the pair not dating.

Episodes

Characters

Each character is named after a type of food or culinary dish.

Main
 Chowder (voiced by Nicky Jones): A chubby lavender  hybrid who serves as an apprentice under the chef Mung Daal, Chowder lives with Mung Daal and his wife, Truffles, in a room at the top of the catering business. Chowder wants to become a great chef, but he is very impulsive and scatterbrained and often gives in to his urges. He is always hungry and eats anything, even a customer's order. Chowder can also regurgitate objects, and he is used as a storage container by the other characters. According to Greenblatt, he is a composite of a cat, a bear, and a rabbit, and his species was verified in at least one episode. C. H. Greenblatt voiced his adult self in the last episode. In the final episode, "Chowder Grows Up" Chowder takes over the Catering Company, has his own apprentice, and marries Panini. He is also a father to 50 babies.

 Mung Daal (voiced by Dwight Schultz): The elderly goblin chef who runs the catering company at which Chowder works. He serves as Chowder’s cooking master. Although his exact age has not been stated, he has mentioned that he has cooked for at least 386 years, and he celebrated 450 years of marriage to Truffles (see below). He likes to impress ladies, to the point where as a child apprentice, he prepared a dish incorrectly due to becoming distracted, which he and Chowder had to time travel to fix. He is a light blue-colored humanoid with an oversized nose and ears and is named after the Indian dish mung daal. Greenblatt had originally planned to give Mung an Indian accent, but later decided against it. In the final episode, Mung is now retired with Truffles, leaving the catering company to Chowder.

 Truffles Daal (voiced by Tara Strong): A mushroom pixie/fairy and Mung Daal's wife who handles the business side of Mung's catering business. She is an extreme choleric. Greenblatt said that he based Truffles on his mother. Greenblatt said that he initially found difficulty in working on any story with Truffles since the character could be "so abrasive" that the Chowder staff had to be "a little more sensitive about finding her softer side." Greenblatt said that the staff eventually decided that "a little Truffles goes a long way." Therefore, she would appear occasionally in Chowder in a manner similar to how Oscar the Grouch appears on Sesame Street. In the final episode, Truffles retired along with Mung, possibly giving her job to Panini.

 Shnitzel (voiced by Kevin Michael Richardson in "The Froggy Apple Crumple Thumpkin", and John DiMaggio afterward): A taupe rock monster and professional chef who works at Mung Daal's Catering Company. His vocabulary consists almost entirely of "radda", while it's translated as "okay", although he sometimes says other simple words. He talks in the episode "The Trouble with Truffles" because he finally gets calm enough. Shnitzel is the "straight man" to the other more excitable characters and is frequently agitated. He gets stuck with menial labor or cleanup duty, as well as heavy lifting because he is incredibly strong. Although usually angered by Chowder's antics, Shnitzel really has a soft spot for Chowder, as he cries when it was thought that Chowder has vanished forever. Kevin Michael Richardson voiced Shnitzel for the debut episode "The Froggy Apple Crumple Thumpkin" and was replaced at the last moment by DiMaggio due to Richardson being busy with other projects at the time. In the final episode, Shnitzel has left the catering company and lives a happy life with his wife, Endive.

 Panini (voiced by Liliana Mumy): A cat-bear-rabbit hybrid who has a crush on Chowder and reminds him at every opportunity. Chowder does not return her feelings and responds with "I'm not your boyfriend!" whenever she greets him. Panini is an apprentice to Ms. Endive and is also possessive of Chowder. Panini gets jealous when she sees Chowder with another girl, which causes Chowder to try and avoid her. Her original character concept had her bully Chowder in a manner described by Greenblatt as similar to Angelica Pickles from Rugrats. Greenblatt removed the pointy ears since he felt this did not fit in with the rounded shapes in Chowder. Greenblatt did not like characters similar to Angelica and believed that he needed to make Panini "cuter and sweeter". Greenblatt said that the details of Panini formed when the creator decided that Panini had a crush on Chowder; since Chowder is not old enough to fall in love with females, according to Greenblatt this aspect would frustrate Chowder "in a more fun way". In the last episode, it is shown that Chowder finally returned Panini's feelings and accepted her because he realizes that he made Panini's life miserable and they are married with many kids and was voiced by Grey DeLisle. Panini's name literally means "sandwiches" in Italian, while her former name, Borlotti, is a type of bean. In the final episode, Panini married Chowder, and is currently a mother of 50, after which she promised Chowder to stop having more.

 Kimchi (voiced by C. H. Greenblatt): Chowder's pet stink cloud, who lives in a cage next to his bed. Kimchi is an anthropomorphic flatulence cloud (due to the odor of kimchi). He likes things with odors unpleasant for the other characters, and he "talks" by making fart sounds. Kimchi was first seen in the episode "The Froggy Apple Crumple Thumpkin". Kimchi is usually shown with a blank personality but in "Stinky Love" it is shown that he has an opinion. What happens to Kimchi in the final episode is unknown, but it’s possible that he still lives with Chowder.

 Gazpacho (voiced by Dana Snyder): A woolly mammoth storekeeper who sells strange produce and ingredients at the farmer's market. Gazpacho is Chowder's best friend. He does his best to offer advice to Chowder when needed. He lives with his overbearing mother, who never appears on the screen, but is present at the end of the episode "Gazpacho!". In "The Spookiest House in Marzipan" it is hinted that Gazpacho has no mother, and that he actually suffers from dissociative identity disorder, but creator Greenblatt says this was merely to "pay homage to Psycho". Gazpacho shows no interest in moving out and improving his own life. Gazpacho's worst enemies are ninjas. Greenblatt named him after the cold soup gazpacho; Greenblatt said that he did not know why, but the name suited the character immediately. In the final episode, Gazpacho closed the stand and became a nomad. He later pursued his dream and opened a Comedy Night Club.

 Ms. Endive (voiced by Mindy Sterling): An intelligent, and snobbish carrot/anteater/elephant hybrid who teaches cooking to Panini with strict discipline. She is usually depicted as gargantuan in size. This is shown in the episode "The Apprentice Games" where Mung Daal and Chowder enter the games by riding on Endive's posterior. She regularly berates Mung, whom she considers a rival. In the episode "Chowder's Girlfriend", it is revealed she despises boys and boyfriends because her fiancé (heavily implied to be Mung but confirmed not to be) did not show up on their wedding day. Ms. Endive is first seen in the second episode with Panini, "Chowder's Girlfriend". The creator describes her as Martha Stewart with Oompa-Loompa colors. Greenblatt chose to name her after the endive since endive is bitter and Belgian endive is fancy; hence the character is bitter and fancy. Endive's character stayed constant throughout the initial development. The long nose, which changed from a rectangular shape to a triangle shape for the final version, represents how Endive looks down at other characters. It was revealed in later episodes that Ms. Endive is in love with Shnitzel. Greenblatt said that her evolution throughout the series was fun to observe, especially when William Reiss wrote plots involving Endive. In the final episode, Endive is living a happy life with her husband, Shnitzel.

 Gorgonzola (voiced by Will Shadley): A young green rat apprentice candle holder with an unlikeable attitude. He shows jealousy towards Chowder because Chowder has a better job than him. He occasionally uses Chowder, and if forced, partners with him in games. Since blue cheese was one of the few foods Greenblatt disliked, he decided to use the name "gorgonzola" for a character who did not get along with Chowder. Gorgonzola wears tattered brown clothes and no shoes and has a partially melted candle on his head (for traditional reasons). He is desperate to get cash and will do almost anything to get it. Gorgonzola also loves to play Sniffleball, as seen in the episode "Sniffleball". Despite his unpleasant and boastful attitude to Chowder, Chowder sees him as a close friend, which irritates him even more. Gorgonzola is an apprentice to Stilton, who is a candle holder, hence why both characters have burning candles on their heads. In the final episode, Gorgonzola runs a very successful company and is voiced by Dave Wittenberg.

Recurring
 Kiwi (voiced by C. H. Greenblatt) is a photorealistic pink creature who always gives advice to Chowder and his friends and occasionally provides interstitial narrations, especially at times where particularly corny humor is displayed. His name is revealed (for the first and only time ever in the show's run) in the episode "Brain Grub", where it is known that after Chowder alters the animated universe, Kiwi is reduced to selling used cars.

 Ceviche (voiced by Elan Garfias): A young yellow (and somewhat androgynous) goat apprentice to Paté and Panini's best friend, Ceviche was introduced in the episode "The Apprentice Games". He practices aerobic-style dancing and is very charitable and kind to others. Because of his admirable attitude and amazing talents (as well as good looks, as it was shown on one episode that he has a well-sculpted body) he is well-liked. He is good friends with Panini and will make unwanted advances upon her, which are either refused or unnoticed. Ceviche is also a close friend to Chowder. He speaks in a monotonous voice and serves as deadpan humor for the show.

 Paté (voiced by John DiMaggio): A tall, well-sculpted humanoid ballet dance master and operatic singer with a deep voice, grass-green hair, a small black hat, and exaggerated lips who is the mentor of Ceviche. Paté was introduced briefly on the second episode of the first show "Chowder's Girlfriend" (Episode #1b), where he sings "I'm Not Your Boyfriend" on stage to Panini (on behalf of Chowder) in front of an audience. His name, however, was revealed for the first time on "The Apprentice Games" (Episode 20), where he appeared as a judge for the Marzipan City Apprentice Games. In that same episode, it was also revealed that he lives in another dimension, as was shown by the portal through which he and Ceviche made their entrance and exit.

 Chestnut (originally voiced by Tone Loc, then John DiMaggio): Like the food, Chestnut is small and tough. He is a tiny, blue horned imp with a deep, gravelly voice and, to many character's surprises, is physically very strong. Because of his size, he uses everyday objects as other things (e.g. using a briefcase for a hydrofoil or a hat as a vacation home). He sings small songs to himself, usually consisting of his catchphrase of "Dinka-loo, Dinka-lee." He is the teacher of the BLTs, a parody of the SATs. He always refers to himself in the third person when speaking.

 Reuben (voiced by Paul Reubens): A pig who is a conman and steals from others.

 Mr. Fugu (voiced by Bob Joles): A sentient floating balloon who is said to be Mung's most frequent customer. He is proven to be more greedy than Chowder and never shares any food with him. He is often seen with his valet, Foie Gras, a Maneki-neko (meows provided by George Takei) holding Mr. Fugu's string as he cannot control his flotation.

 Sgt. Hoagie (voiced by Diedrich Bader): He is a dog who is a police officer in Marzipan City. In "The Hot Date", he was going out on a date after several years and asked the other cops for advice.

Production

Development

During his time working on Nickelodeon's SpongeBob SquarePants, Greenblatt had been sketching various characters for his own animation series concept. Greenblatt originally based the premise on the idea of the sorcerer's apprentice style of story, such as The Sword in the Stone. The plot devices were modified so that the story revolves around a master chef who teaches his young apprentice how to cook. Chowder himself was developed with no specific species in mind, but rather with the intentions of invoking the image of a child's soft squeeze toy. Some of the inspiration comes from Dr. Seuss, with other inspiration from Saturday morning cartoons.

Greenblatt pitched the concept to Cartoon Network in the mid-2000s when he began working as a writer and storyboard artist for The Grim Adventures of Billy & Mandy, and two years later the series was approved with another year for production before the pilot episode aired. Greenblatt estimates he spent about seven years working on Chowder before the show made it to air in 2007.

Format
Episodes are produced in seasons which consist of twenty 24-minute episodes. Each episode is produced with a 30-second puppet sequence that is meant to run over the ending credits. Episodes can be purchased from the iTunes Store in the United States which are delivered with the sequences as are episodes which are available on Cartoon Network's VOD website also within the United States.

One of the unusual design features of the show is the patterns used on the clothing or players. The patterns are developed as a full-screen image and then sent to the production house, where the characters are modified to fill the patterns in over the character clothing. Using this technique, when a character moves, their patterns do not follow, but display as a "static" background. A similar technique was used in the Monkey Island video game series (particularly for the character Stan), the Nickelodeon series The Off-Beats, and the Mr. Bean animated series.

The show is also known for the very wide variety of media used in various episodes. These include animation using watercolors and ink-and-paint in addition to the cartoon's classic pattern style. It also uses stop motion animation with real food, action figures, and clay; live-action scenes with the voice actors of the show and puppets; both marionette and hand-controlled. This was also sometimes used in Courage the Cowardly Dog. It boasts one of the most diverse varieties of mediums used in any single series.

Cancellation
Chowder was canceled by Cartoon Network in August 2009, as the network felt the show did not fit its new demographic of older boys, favoring shows such as the live-action Destroy, Build, Destroy instead. On his blog, C. H. Greenblatt expressed relief about having his schedule freed up by the cancellation, saying: "I didn't really think there'd be this many upsides to having a show officially canceled by a network, but I'm feeling happier than I've been in a long time. Since we've only got post-production, my schedule finally eases up. I haven't had a break like this in a long, long time... Chowder has opened up a lot of awesome possibilities for me, and creatively I'm feeling more inspired than ever."

Home media

The entire series has been released in ten Region 3 fullscreen DVD volumes in Thailand from MVD Company Limited. Every episode of Chowder is also available on the iTunes Store.

Reception

Critical response
Chowder received mostly positive reviews. Barry Garron of The Hollywood Reporter thought that the show would appeal to children and adults alike, using exotic artwork, unusual settings, and a zany cast of characters. On Toon Zone, Ed Liu expands on the animation and crazy antics of the characters, pointing that "the humor is kid-friendly without being juvenile" and praising it for getting laughs, "without resorting to an excess of toilet humor, even if Chowder's pet happens to be a sentient fart cloud." Aaron H. Bynum on Animation Insider wrote, "Featuring brightly colored environments, stylishly matted/fixed background artwork and humorously designed characters with unique personalities to boot, Chowder is one of the network's largest creative accomplishments in recent years."

Awards and nominations

Cultural impact
In 2019, American rapper Lil Nas X released a song entitled "Panini", which was named after the Chowder character of the same name, and later made a music video for the remix of his song featuring characters from Chowder. Although Greenblatt was not involved in the production of the music video, he did praise the video on his Tumblr blog.

In 2019, over 200 animators collaborated and reanimated the 22 minute Season 2 special "Hey Hey, it's Knishmas" in their own styles. It was dedicated to CH Greenblatt and everyone who worked on the original show. The video has over 1 million views as of 2022.

References

External links

 
 

 
 2007 American television series debuts
 2010 American television series endings
 2000s American animated television series
 2000s American surreal comedy television series
 2010s American animated television series
 2010s American surreal comedy television series
 American children's animated adventure television series
 American children's animated comedy television series
 American children's animated fantasy television series
 American television series with live action and animation
 American television shows featuring puppetry
 Animated television series about children
Television series by Cartoon Network Studios
 English-language television shows
 Metafictional television series
 Television series created by C. H. Greenblatt
Cartoon Network original programming